Castorimorpha is the suborder of rodents containing the beavers and the kangaroo rats. A 2017 study using retroposon markers indicated that they are most closely related to the Anomaluromorpha (the scaly-tailed squirrels and the springhare) and Myomorpha (mouse-like rodents).

Taxonomy
Suborder Castorimorpha
Superfamily Castoroidea
Family †Eutypomyidae
Family Castoridae - beavers
Family †Rhizospalacidae
Infraorder Geomorpha
Superfamily †Eomyoidea
Family †Eomyidae
Superfamily Geomyoidea
Family †Heliscomyidae
Family †Florentiamyidae
Family †Entoptychidae
Family Geomyidae - pocket gophers
Family Heteromyidae - kangaroo rats and mice
 Diplolophidae 
Genus †Floresomys 
Genus †Texomys 
Genus †Jimomys 
Genus †Diplolophus 
Genus †Schizodontomys
Genus †Griphomys 
Genus †Meliakrouniomys

† indicates extinct taxa.

References

Citations

Bibliography
Carleton, M. D. and G. G. Musser. 2005. Order Rodentia. Pp 745–752 in Mammal Species of the World A Taxonomic and Geographic Reference.  Johns Hopkins University Press, Baltimore.
McKenna, Malcolm C., and Bell, Susan K. 1997. Classification of Mammals Above the Species Level. Columbia University Press, New York, 631 pp. 

Rodent taxonomy
Mammal suborders
Extant Eocene first appearances
Taxa named by Albert Elmer Wood